Vahisvaramudayar Temple is a Hindu temple dedicated to the deity Shiva, located at Malayadippatti in Kulatthur taluk of Pudukkottai district in Tamil Nadu, India.

Location
This cave temple is located at a distance of 33 km from Pudukottai, in Killukkottai.

Cave temples
In Malayadippatti, two cave temples are found. While one is devoted for Shiva another is devoted for Vishnu. This is a twin temple.  Shiva temple is known as Vahisvaramudayar Temple and Vishnu temple is known as Pallikonda Perumal Temple.

Presiding deity
The presiding deity is known as Vahisvaramudayar. The goddess is known as Periyanlayaki.

Specialities
In one cave both Shiva and Vishnu Temples are found. This is Shiva temple. In this temple inscription of Nandivarma Pallava, 775-826 C.E., is found. From this inscription it is learnt that this temple was built around 730 C.E. by Kuvaavan Satthan who is also known as Vitel Vidugu Muttharayan.

Puja
Pujas are held four times daily at Kalasanthi (7.00 a.m.), Uttchikkalam (noon 12.00), Sayaratchai (6.00 p.m.) and arthajamam (8.30 p.m.).The temple is opened for worship from 6.00 to 12.00 noon and 5.00 to 8.00 p.m.

References

External links
விக்கிமேப்பியாவில் மலையடிப்பட்டி வாகீஸ்வரமுடையார் கோயில் அமைவிடம்

Hindu temples in Pudukkottai district